Elämäjärvi is a medium-sized lake of Finland. It is situated in Pihtipudas, in the area in Keski-Suomi. Lake's water flows through canal to Saanijärvi.

See also
List of lakes in Finland

References
 Elämäjärvi in Järviwiki Web Service 

Lakes of Pihtipudas